Jean-Paul Elkann (28 December 1921 – 23 November 1996) was a French banker. He was president of Compagnie Financière Jean-Paul Elkann (CFJPE).

Biography

Early life and education 
Born in Paris, Jean-Paul Elkann was the son of Montbéliard-born industrialist Armand Elkann (1882–1962) and his wife Berthe Bloch. He was raised in Lycée Janson de Sailly in Paris. He was admitted to study at Polytechnique in 1940 but left France with his family to escape the anti-Jewish persecutions.

Refugee in New York 
Elkann continued his studies in the United States and received a Bachelor of Science degree from Columbia Business School in 1943 while living at The Pierre hotel in New York City.

Along with his father, Elkann entered in the metallurgical industry. Soon after, he became the owner and president of the company Vanadium Steel Italiana from 1948 and Vanadium Alloys Steel Canada (since 1950) and Vice President of Vanadium Alloys Steel USA from 1953.

Return to Paris 
In 1953, Elkann returned to France and went into the fragrance industry. In 1962, he became the president of Parfums Caron. Thereafter, then he became the vice president of Parfums Givenchy (1980–1983), director of Christian Dior SA Group and director of several major French companies.
He was also the president of the Consistoire israélite de Paris from 1967 to 1982 and then chairman of the Israelite Central Consistory of France from 1982 to 1992 and interim president of the Conseil Représentatif des Institutions juives de France (CRIF) in late 1982, replacing Alain de Rothschild who died of a heart attack in October 1982.

Although being himself a non-practical Jew, he supported the Orthodox movement. As quoted the Chief Rabbi, Michel Gugenheim, Elkann told the leader of Reform Judaism in the United States, Alexander Schindler: "The only difference between you and me, Mr. rabbi, is that I violate the law, but I do not change it, and you want to change the law." He was also the vice president of the France-Israel Chamber of Commerce, the chairman of the Association de coopération économique France-Israël, Haifa Technion governor, administrator of Yabné school and administrator of the Alliance Israelite Universelle and vice Chairman of the Social Action Committee Israelite de Paris (CASIP).

In addition to his business career, Elkann served on the board of overseers of Columbia Business School.

Personal life and death 
Elkann married in New York with Carla Ovazza (1922–2000), heir to a Jewish banking family of Turin and Ettore Ovazza's niece, whom he met at Columbia University. They have a son, Alain Elkann, who was born in New York in 1950 and in 1975 married to the influential Italian industrialist and principal shareholder of Fiat, Gianni Agnelli's daughter, Margherita Agnelli, from whom they have three descendants: John Elkann, Lapo Elkann, and Ginevra Elkann. Since Edoardo Agnelli's mysterious passing, Gianni Agnelli chose John Elkann as the heir for the family estate.

After divorce, Elkann Jean remarried on 9 November 1953 with Francoise Schuhl, with whom he had a daughter: Brigitte Elkann. He died on 23 November 1996 in Paris.

Honours 
 Commandeur de la Légion d'honneur, 1988
 National Order of Merit (France), 1996

References 

French bankers
Clothing companies of France
Commandeurs of the Légion d'honneur
Vanadium
20th-century French Jews
1921 births
1996 deaths
Columbia Business School alumni